Local elections were held in the German state of Hesse on 14 March 2021 to elect district, municipal, and city councils and local boards, as well as mayors in some cities and district administrators in some districts. Indirect elections also took place for the Planning Board of the Frankfurt Rhein-Main Regional Authority and the regional councils of Hesse's three governing districts.

All EU citizens aged 18 or over on election day were eligible to vote if they had lived in a municipality for at least six weeks. Eligible voters who were not EU citizens could vote if they had lived in a municipality for at least three months.

Election date
Local elections take place every five years in Hesse. The election date of 14 March 2021 was set by the state government on 18 May 2020.

Direct elections for a number of mayors and district administrators were originally scheduled to take place between April and October 2020. Due to the COVID-19 pandemic in Germany, these were postponed on 24 March 2020 by the Hessian state parliament, and were scheduled to take place on 1 November 2021 at the earliest. However, city and district councils were permitted to hold alongside the regular local elections if they choose to do so. As a result, the district administrators of Bergstraße, Odenwaldkreis, Schwalm-Eder-Kreis, Kassel, and Hersfeld-Rotenburg and the mayors of Hanau, Bad Homburg vor der Höhe, Fulda, Marburg, and Wetzlar were elected alongside the local elections on 14 March 2021, with runoffs held as necessary.

Electoral system
Bodies with multiple members, such as councils, are elected via proportional representation using panachage. Voters have as many votes as there are seats up for election, which may be cast for candidates in lists. Voters may cast up to three votes for any given candidate, and may cast votes for candidates from multiple lists. Elections to a single position, such as mayors and district administrators, are conducted via the two-round system.

Size of councils
The number of members on each district and city/municipal council is determined by the number of residents it serves. For the 2021 elections, figures released by the Hessian State Statistical Office in September 2015 were used. The number of seats on local boards are determined by the statutes of the respective city or municipality. Local boards must comprise between three and nine members, unless the board serves over 8,000 people, in which case it may have up to nineteen members.

Background and parties
The table below lists the results of the 2016 local elections in the rural districts and the urban districts.

Results

Results in independent cities

References

2021 elections in Germany
Elections in Hesse